The women's 400 metre freestyle at the 2007 World Aquatics Championships took place on 25 March (preliminaries and finals) at Rod Laver Arena in Melbourne, Australia.

The existing records at the start of the event were:
 World record (WR): 4:02.13, Laure Manaudou (France), 6 August 2006 in Budapest, Hungary
 Championship record (CR): 4:06.28, Tracey Wickham (Australia), at West Berlin 1978 (24 August 1978)

Results

Final

Preliminary heats

References

2007 Worlds results: Women's 400m free--Prelims from OmegaTiming.com (official timer of the 2007 World Championships); Retrieved 2009-07-09.
2007 Worlds results: Women's 400m free--Finals from OmegaTiming.com (official timer of the 2007 World Championships); Retrieved 2009-07-09.

Swimming at the 2007 World Aquatics Championships
2007 in women's swimming